Mangalore (SC) or Mangalur (SC) was the legislative assembly in Cuddalore district, which includes the city, Mangalore, Tamil Nadu. The seat was reserved for scheduled caste. It was part of the Chidambaram (Lok Sabha constituency) until 2009. Mangalore was dissolved and merged with Tittakudi Member of Assembly Constituency.

Members of the Legislative Assembly

Election results

2006

2001

1996

1991

1989

1984

1980

1977

1971

1967

References

External links
 

Former assembly constituencies of Tamil Nadu
Cuddalore district